Zhang Xueying (born 18 June 1997), also known as Sophie Zhang, is a Chinese actress.
Zhang is regarded as one of the "New Four Dan actresses of the post-95s Generation", along with Zhang Zifeng, Vicky Chen and Guan Xiaotong.

Career
In 2003, Zhang made her acting debut in the television series, Hero During Yongle Period.  
She built up her popularity in China with various supporting roles in television series; such as The Romance of the Condor Heroes (2014), The Whirlwind Girl (2015) and Promise of Migratory Birds (2016).

In 2017, Zhang played her first small-screen leading role in When We Were Young, a remake of the South Korean television series Who Are You: School 2015. In 2018, she starred in romance drama  Summer's Desire, based on Ming Xiaoxi's novel Pao Mo Zhi Xia.

In 2019, Zhang rose to prominence for her role in the film Einstein and Einstein directed by Cao Baoping, which won her critical acclaim. 
The same year, Zhang starred in the historical romance drama Princess Silver; and period action drama Hot Blooded Youth.

In 2020, Zhang is set to star in the film Flowers Bloom in the Ashes  directed by Chen Kaige.

Filmography

Film

Television series

Discography

Singles

Soundtracks

Other appearances

Awards and nominations

References

External links
 

1997 births
21st-century Chinese actresses
Living people
Central Academy of Drama alumni
Chinese television actresses
Chinese film actresses
Actresses from Zhejiang
Chinese child actresses
People from Yiwu